Robert S. Graham may refer to:

 Robert Graham (Arizona politician) (born 1972), American business owner and chairman of the Arizona Republican Party, 2013–17
 Robert S. Graham (American football) (1881–1967), American football player and coach